Roland Powell (born June 12, 1977), better known by his stage name Lil Duval, is an American stand-up comedian and actor. In 2005, he was a finalist on BET's comedy competition series Coming to the Stage. Powell is a series regular to the MTV2 shows Guy Code and Hip Hop Squares. From 2013 to 2014 he hosted the video show Ain't That America on MTV2.

Early life 
Roland Powell was born on June 12, 1977 and raised in Jacksonville, Florida. He adopted the stage name "Lil Duval" to pay homage to his birthplace, Duval County, Florida. After graduating from First Coast High School, he relocated to Atlanta, Georgia.

Duval released his first solo single and music video on April 1, 2014, entitled "Wat Dat Mouf Do?" featuring Trae tha Truth. In 2018, he released "Smile Bitch (Living My Best Life)" featuring Snoop Dogg and Ball Greezy, and the single peaked at number 56 on the Billboard Hot 100.

Filmography 
 Clean Up Man (2005) – Keith
 Stomp the Yard: Homecoming (2010) – Aaron
 Highway (2012) – Earl
 Scary Movie 5 (2013) – Kendra's Brother
 School Dance (2014) – Bam Bam
 Meet the Blacks (2016) – Cronut
 Grow House (2017) – Darius
 The Trap (2019) – Darryl
 The House Next Door: Meet the Blacks 2 (2021) – Cronut

Discography 
Singles
 "Wat Dat Mouf Do" (2014)
 "Smile Bitch (Living My Best Life)" featuring Snoop Dogg and Ball Greezy (2018)
 "Nasty", with Jacquees and Tank (2020)
 "Don't Worry Be Happy" (featuring T.I.) (2020)
 "Big Sexy Thang" with Too Short (2022)

Music video appearances 
In addition to stand-up comedy, Powell also writes for Ozone magazine. He has also appeared in several music videos including:
"Diamond In Tha Back" by Ludacris
"Smile Bitch" by Lil Duval feat. Snoop Dogg & Ball Greezy
"Get Low" by Lil Jon & The East Side Boyz
"Rubber Band Man" by T.I.
"24's" by T.I.
"Be Easy" by T.I.
"Whatever You Like" by T.I.
"What Up, What's Haapnin' by T.I.
"No Matter What" by T.I.
"That's Right" by Big Kuntry King
"Ain't I" by Yung L.A.
"Fairytales" by Wale
"It's Goin' Down" by Yung Joc
"Coffee Shop" by Yung Joc
"Shawty" by Plies
"My President" by Young Jeezy
"I'm On 2.0" by Trae tha Truth
"Lookin' Boy" by Hotstylz
"Ain't No Way Around It (Remix)" by DJ Drama
"FDB" by Young Dro
"Choices (Yup)" by E-40
"Red Cup" By E-40 Feat. T-Pain, Kid Ink And B.o.B
"Law" by Yo Gotti
"Kill 'Em Wit The Shoulders" by Snoop Dogg
"House Party" by Meek Mill
"Tattoo" by D4L
"Shoulder Lean" by Young Dro
"Can't Go For That" by 2 Chainz feat. Ty Dolla Sign & Lil Duval
"Drankin N Smokin" by Future feat. Lil Uzi Vert

Stand up performances 
 BET ComicView (2005 and 2013)
 All Star Comedy Jam – Live from Orlando (2012)
 Cedric the Entertainer: Starting Lineup (2002)

References

External links 
 

1977 births
Living people
21st-century American comedians
African-American male actors
African-American male comedians
American male comedians
American male film actors
American stand-up comedians
Male actors from Jacksonville, Florida
Musicians from Jacksonville, Florida
21st-century African-American people
20th-century African-American people